Brunton is a village and former civil parish, now in the parish of Newton-by-the-Sea, in the county of Northumberland, England. In 1951 the parish had a population of 35.

The village is situated in open flat terrain and gives its name to a former WWII airfield RAF Brunton the concreted runways of which lie immediately north of the village. RAF Brunton was operational as a satellite training airfield for RAF Milfield from the summer of 1942 until early 1946.

Governance 
Brunton is in the Northumberland County Council division of Longhoughton, and the parliamentary constituency of Berwick-upon-Tweed. In 1866 Brunton became a civil parish in its own right until it was abolished on 1 April 1955 and merged with Newton by the Sea.

References

External links

Villages in Northumberland
Former civil parishes in Northumberland